Joseph 'Val' Valiante (June 26, 1926 - June 11, 1985) was a bluegrass musician and singer from New England, known for his mandolin playing and his high tenor voice.

Life and career 
Joe Val was born Joseph Valiante in Everett, Massachusetts. Although raised in the northeast, he took a very early interest in bluegrass music, prompted chiefly by hearing Bill Monroe on radio and records. The region in which Val was raised had a very strong bluegrass affinity. He also listened to local bands, and especially the work of fiddler Tex Logan. It was Logan who coined the name 'Val' (short for Valiante). Tex could not pronounce the Italian last name, thus introducing Joe onstage as Joe 'Val'.

For over 25 years, Joe Val was, in the words of  Peter Rowan, "The voice of bluegrass in New England." It didn't matter that he was a short, skinny Italian from a blue-collar Boston suburb, nor did it matter that his renditions of Bill Monroe and Jimmie Rodgers standards were often tinted by a decidedly Yankee inflection. On-stage he was an unassuming, bespectacled, quietly smiling presence until he opened his mouth to sing. His smooth, high tenor voice made Joe no less an authority than a Bill Monroe or Del McCoury.

Joe Val worked a full-time day job as a typewriter repairman. He often had to ask for time off from work to tour with his band. Joe helped blaze the trail for Boston's folk and bluegrass scene with the Lilly Brothers in the early '60s, and later surrounded himself with the cream of that city's musical crop including Joan Baez, The Charles River Valley Boys, banjo legends Don Stover and Bill Keith, Jim Rooney, and the less well-known members of the New England Bluegrass Boys (most notably a relatively unknown guitarist and singer, Dave Dillon).

Val had started out on guitar, but also played banjo and finally the mandolin, which brought him lasting renown. Joe honed his skills as he played with several bands including the Radio Rangers, the Berkshire Mountain Boys and The Lilly Brothers & Don Stover. Val was in the right place to become involved with the Boston-area bluegrass boom among the region's university and college students in the 1960s. He played and recorded with the Bill Keith-Jim Rooney Band, and The Charles River Valley Boys. In both instances, he comfortably accommodated contemporary shifts in bluegrass but never lost his preference for the traditional form of the music.

In 1970, Joe Val formed his own band, The New England Bluegrass Boys, bringing in Herb Applin (guitar/vocals), Bob French (banjo), and Bob Tidwell (bass). The band recorded their first album, the very first bluegrass release for Rounder Records, entitled One Morning In May in 1972. Joe Val & The New England Bluegrass Boys recorded exclusively with Rounder Records for what turned out to be a relatively short recording career, releasing albums from 1973-84 on that label.

The personnel varied slightly through the years. Among those that played in the band were guitarists/lead vocalists Dave Dillon and Dave Haney, banjo players Paul Silvius, Karl Lauber and Joe Dietz, bass player Eric Levenson, fiddler Sonny Miller and dobro player Roger Williams.

Just when Joe Val made the decision to finally make touring a full-time occupation, he learned that he was suffering from Lymphoma. Joe's last full show was performed during an afternoon set at a festival in Keene, NH in 1984. Shortly after that set, he was shuffled off to the hospital with the help of close friends and fellow musicians. Joe missed the evening set, perhaps for the first time in his long career. The band's final engagement was to be at the 1984 New Year's Eve Jekyll Island Bluegrass Festival in Georgia. Though Joe was feeling ill, he insisted on making the trip from New England and attempted to perform. However he was flown back home to a Boston hospital.

Two major fundraising benefits were held to help defray medical costs and household bills while Joe was ill and unable to work. The first benefit concert was organized in November 1984 by Len Domler (The Sounding Board Coffeehouse) and Kevin Lynch in West Hartford, CT. The Johnson Mountain Boys, Del & Jerry McCoury, Bob & Dan Paisley and Traver Hollow donated their time, expenses, and talents to entertain a sold-out theater crowd.

The second benefit, the Joe Val Benefit and Appreciation Day, on June 9, 1985 (two days before Joe died) was organized by the Boston Bluegrass Union (BBU), the now defunct North River Bluegrass Association (Cathy & Ted Howland and Linda Fitzpatrick) and many volunteers. A full day and early evening of jams, workshops and concerts drew many familiar names and a large crowd. Among the performers were the duo of Tony Rice & Jimmy Gaudreau (making a surprise appearance), John Lincoln Wright, Bill Keith, Traver Hollow, White Mountain Bluegrass, Joe's brother Paul Valiante (singing with Traver Hollow) and more.

During his final weeks, Joe was humbled and comforted by the outpouring of good will and best wishes. He received calls, visits and countless cards & letters from fans and friends, as well as many of his peers in the music business. The likes of Joan Baez, Bob Dylan, Ricky Skaggs, and several other notable figures from Joe's early days in the Boston area music scene, took the time to make personal hospital visits and phone calls.

Joe Val was honored throughout his funeral service with several renditions of Gospel songs sung and played in the upper loft of the church by New England Bluegrass Boys, Dave Dillon, Herb Applin, Paul Silvius, Dave Haney. and Karl Lauber. Joe was laid to rest in the historic Mount Feake Cemetery at 203 Prospect Street, Waltham, MA. His headstone is easily identifiable by an engraving of his 1923 Gibson 'Lloyd Loar' Mandolin, designed by Joe's devoted friend and bass player, Eric Levenson.

The International Bluegrass Music Association posthumously presented Joe Val with an 'IBMA Award Of Merit' for his dedication and lifetime contributions to bluegrass music during their 1995 IBMA World of Bluegrass annual bluegrass trade show & convention. That presentation was made by John Rossbach, accompanied by Joe's mandolin. Although John did not know Joe Val, he gave an impressive history of Joe as a person, as well as his accomplishments and contributions to the bluegrass music genre. Joe Val received a standing ovation from a knowledgeable IBMA audience, including many of Joe's peers.

In 1986, an annual "Joe Val Day" memorial event was organized and held on the Waltham Common in the center of Waltham, MA. One of Joe's best friends, next door neighbor and successful Waltham ophthalmologist, the late Rod O'Neill, was the founder. O'Neill, along with town treasurer Steve Kilgore and handful of others, produced the event for several years. Many of Joe's friends, fans and fellow bluegrass musicians volunteered their time and talents, including nearly all of his sidemen. At that time a portion of the Joe Val Day proceeds were used to develop an annual 'Joe Val Music Scholarship' for the Waltham elementary school system. Sadly, that scholarship no longer exists.

When the original "Joe Val Day" ceased operations on the Waltham Common, the Boston Bluegrass Union took the reins. The BBU eventually moved it to a larger location, the Newton North High School sports field in neighboring Newton, MA. In the mid-1990s, the BBU event ultimately evolved into the "Joe Val Bluegrass Festival".

In 2000, the BBU expanded and refined their festival concept, relocating it to Presidents' Day Weekend at a nearby hotel. The first indoor mid-winter event took place in Dedham, MA and, since 2003, in Framingham, MA.

The festival won the coveted "Event of the Year" award in 2006 from the International Bluegrass Music Association. Information for the annual Joe Val Bluegrass Festival, held each February, can be found at the BBU website Joe Val Bluegrass Festival. Festival proceeds support a number of Bluegrass Music educational programs.

Much of Joe's memorabilia is housed in the Waltham Museum, including photos from the very first "Joe Val Day" on Waltham Common. Photos are mounted on the original 'Joe Val Day' banner which served as a backdrop for the stage. Also included in the museum are Waltham country music legends Gerry Robichaud & The Country Masters, television personality Rex Trailer, John Penny & Bella Lee and George Mahoney (of "George & Dixie") who opened the Webster, MA country music venue Indian Ranch in 1946.

Discography 
Charles River Valley Boys, Bluegrass and Old Time Music, Prestige Records (1965) / Available on CD (2003)

Charles River Valley Boys, Beatle Country, Elektra Records (UK 1966) out of print / Available on CD (February 2006)

Joe Val & The New England Bluegrass Boys 
One Morning in May Rounder Records (1972)

Joe Val & the New England Bluegrass Boys Rounder Records (1974)

Not a Word from Home Rounder Records (1977)

Bound to Ride Rounder Records (1979)

Live in Holland Strictly Country Records (Netherlands 1981)

Sparkling Brown Eyes Rounder Records (1983)

Cold Wind Rounder Records (1983)

Released posthumously: Diamond Joe Rounder Records (1995)

Legacy
The International Bluegrass Music Association posthumously presented Joe Val with an "IBMA Award Of Merit" for his dedication and lifetime contributions to bluegrass music during their 1995 IBMA World of Bluegrass annual bluegrass trade show & convention. That presentation was made by John Rossbach, accompanied by Joe's mandolin. Joe Val received a standing ovation from a knowledgeable IBMA audience, including many of Joe's peers.

The first memorial Joe Val Day was organized in 1986, and the event has since grown into the three-day Joe Val Bluegrass Festival featuring many different musicians entertaining thousands of fans. The festival won the coveted "Event of the Year" award in 2006 from the International Bluegrass Music Association.

Discography

Albums as featured artist
 "Livin' on the Mountain" with Bill Keith and Jim Rooney (Prestige Folklore Records, 1963)
Bluegrass Get-Together with the Charles River Valley Boys (Prestige Folklore Records, 1964)
Charles River Valley Boys "Beatle Country" (Elektra Records, 1966)

Joe Val & The New England Bluegrass Boys albums
One Morning in May Rounder Records (1972)
Joe Val & the New England Bluegrass Boys Rounder Records (1974)
Not a Word from Home Rounder Records (1977)
Bound to Ride Rounder Records 1979)
Live in Holland Strictly Country Records (Netherlands 1981)
Sparkling Brown Eyes Rounder Records (1983)
Cold Wind Rounder Records (1983)

Compilation albums
 "2nd Pioneer Valley Jamboree" [Various, recorded live at Hangar One in Amherst, MA] (Pioneer #PNR 102, 1981) Prairie Home Companion "Tourists: Music & Laughter From The Road, 1981-82" (High Bridge Audio, 2008)
Diamond Joe (Rounder Records 1995)

External links
 Articles about Joe Val on Rounder Records.

References

American bluegrass musicians
1926 births
1985 deaths
Musicians from Massachusetts
Bluegrass festivals
20th-century American musicians
American bluegrass mandolinists